Reina is a Spanish municipality in the province of Badajoz, Extremadura. As of 2007, it had a population of 189 and consisted of an area of 64.7 km².

References

External links
Official website 
Profile 

 auto

Municipalities in the Province of Badajoz